Gumto railway station is a small railway station in Papum Pare district, Arunachal Pradesh. Its code is GMTO. It serves Gumto town. The station consists of one platform. The platform is not well sheltered. It lacks many facilities including water and sanitation.

Major trains 

 Naharlagun–Guwahati Intercity Express

References

Railway stations in Papum Pare district
Rangiya railway division